Reinhold Hintermaier (born 14 February 1956 in Altheim) is a former Austrian footballer.

Club career
Hintermaier started his professional career with SK VÖEST Linz and won the Austrian Football Bundesliga title in his first season. After six years he moved to Germany to play for 1. FC Nürnberg with whom he lost the German Cup Final in 1982, Eintracht Braunschweig and 1. FC Saarbrücken.

He retired in 1988 but curiously made a comeback four years later with Nürnberg where he had been youth team coach. After his second retirement, he became youth coach again at Nürnberg and Greuther Fürth.

International career
He earned 15 caps for the Austria national football team between 1978 and 1982 and played in the 1982 FIFA World Cup, where he scored a goal in the second round match against Northern Ireland.

Honours
 Austrian Football Bundesliga: 1973–74

References

External links
 Reinhold Hintermaier at FLZ 
 German Reinhold Hintermaier at Fussballportal 
 

1956 births
Living people
People from Braunau am Inn District
Austrian footballers
Austrian expatriate footballers
Austria international footballers
1982 FIFA World Cup players
1. FC Nürnberg players
Eintracht Braunschweig players
1. FC Saarbrücken players
Austrian Football Bundesliga players
Bundesliga players
2. Bundesliga players
Expatriate footballers in Germany
Austrian football managers
FC Linz managers
FC Linz players
Association football midfielders
Footballers from Upper Austria
Austrian expatriate sportspeople in West Germany
Expatriate footballers in West Germany